Philip Jensen (born 8 November 1967 in Te Aroha) is a former New Zealand representative hammer thrower.

His biggest success came at the 2002 Commonwealth Games held in Manchester, England where he won the silver medal. He also competed in the IAAF World Cup held in Madrid, Spain that same year.

Earlier in his sporting career he represented New Zealand in Rugby union, when from November 1984 to January 1985 he toured the United Kingdom with the New Zealand Secondary Schools Rugby union Team. Later that year he was again picked for the New Zealand Secondary Schools Rugby union Team who toured Australia.

Sporting Career highlights

Athletics

World Cup

Commonwealth Games

New Zealand Track & Field Championships 
Philip has had a very long career, with some interesting statistics relating to national titles, as follows:-
  most titles – 20.
  longest career – 26 years between his first title win and his last.
  most in a row – 17 consecutive titles.

Personal Best 
His personal best is 72.06m, achieved in February 1998 in Auckland, New Zealand.

References

External links 
 
 NZOC Profile 
 Page with Photo at Sporting Heroes

1967 births
Living people
New Zealand male hammer throwers
Athletes (track and field) at the 1990 Commonwealth Games
Athletes (track and field) at the 1998 Commonwealth Games
Athletes (track and field) at the 2002 Commonwealth Games
Commonwealth Games silver medallists for New Zealand
Sportspeople from Te Aroha
Commonwealth Games medallists in athletics
Medallists at the 2002 Commonwealth Games